Cyril Woolford ( – 30 November 2018) was an English professional rugby league footballer who played in the 1940s, 1950s and 1960s.

Background
Cyril Woolford's birth was registered in Tadcaster, West Riding of Yorkshire, England, he lived in the Featherstone area, he was a domestic appliance technician.

Playing career

County honours
Cyril Woolford won caps for Yorkshire while at Featherstone Rovers; he played right-, i.e. number 3, in the 25-11 victory over Lancashire in the 1957–58 County Championship during the 1957–58 season at Naughton Park, Widnes on Monday 23 September 1957, and played , i.e. number 5, and scored a try in the 38-28 victory over Lancashire in the 1959–60 County Championship during the 1959–60 season at Hilton Park, Leigh on Wednesday 11 November 1959.

County Cup Final appearances
Cyril Woolford played , i.e. number 5,  scored a try, and was vice-captain in Featherstone Rovers' 15-14 victory over Hull F.C. in the 1959–60 Yorkshire County Cup Final during the 1959–60 season at Headingley Rugby Stadium, Leeds on Saturday 31 October 1959.

Club career
Cyril Woolford made his début for Featherstone Rovers on Saturday 7 April 1956, he broke Eric Batten's "most tries in a season" record for  Featherstone Rovers, by scoring 31-tries during the 1959–60 season, this record was later extended to 48-tries by Paul Newlove during the 1992–93 season (albeit at Second Division level), and he played his last match for Featherstone Rovers during the 1960–61 season.

Honoured at Featherstone Rovers
Cyril Woolford is a Featherstone Rovers Hall of Fame inductee.

Personal life
Cyril Woolford's marriage to Elizabeth (née Bradburn) (birth registered during third ¼  in Pontefract district) was registered during second ¼ 1954 in Pontefract district. They had children; the future rugby league  who played in the 1980s for Featherstone Rovers (Heritage № 604); Neil M. Woolford (birth registered during first ¼  in Wakefield district). Cyril Woolford was the grandfather of the association footballer; Martyn Woolford.

References

External links
Cyril Woolford at marklaspalmas.blogspot.co.uk
Memory Box Search at archive.castigersheritage.com

1927 births
2018 deaths
Castleford Tigers players
Doncaster R.L.F.C. players
English rugby league players
Featherstone Rovers players
People from Tadcaster
Rugby league centres
Rugby league players from Yorkshire
Rugby league wingers
Yorkshire rugby league team players